The Jamieson J (also known as the Take 1) was a four-seat utility aircraft built in the United States in the early 1960s. It was designed and constructed by Jamieson Corp, which had been purchasing military surplus Culver Cadets and remanufacturing them for the civil market. Jamieson's first aircraft was the J-1 Jupiter built in 1949 which had a V-tail replacing the standard type tail of the Cadet. What made the Jupiter attractive to the private plane market was its price of 
$2500. Four Jupiters were produced. The 1960s Model J was patterned closely on the Cadet as the earlier J-1 Jupiter was, but was a larger, new-built aircraft. Like its forerunner it was a conventional, low-wing cantilever monoplane, but featured retractable tricycle undercarriage.

Certification was achieved in July 1963, after which only another two examples were built before development was abandoned.

Specifications

References

External links
 aerofiles.com

1960s United States civil utility aircraft
Low-wing aircraft
V-tail aircraft
Single-engined tractor aircraft
Aircraft first flown in 1962